Fifth Avenue (sometimes spelled 5th Avenue) is one of the longest streets in Pittsburgh, Pennsylvania, United States.  It begins downtown and moves eastward for over five miles (9 km).  Fifth Avenue passes by the Carlow University, the Cathedral of Learning and other buildings of the University of Pittsburgh, then forms the borders between Shadyside on the north and Squirrel Hill and Point Breeze to the south.  Finally, after passing Chatham University, The Ellis School, and Mellon Park, it turns north and forms the border between Larimer on the west and North Point Breeze and Homewood (Pittsburgh) on the east.  At the intersection with Frankstown Avenue its name becomes Washington Boulevard (PA 8) and descends a branch of Negley Run to meet Allegheny River Boulevard (PA 130) near the Highland Park Bridge.

At least 30 streets either cross or intersect with Fifth Avenue, including Penn Avenue, which intersects it twice (once in Downtown and again near Point Breeze).  Forbes Avenue parallels it from Downtown through Uptown and Oakland before diverging at the University of Pittsburgh; they form a one-way pair through Uptown and Oakland (Forbes from Downtown toward Oakland, Fifth from Oakland toward Downtown).

Photographs

Major junctions

References 

2. 
Party On Fifth Ave. by Mac Miller was written about a party on fifth avenue.

Streets in Pittsburgh